Nilambur Ayisha (b.1935) is an Indian actress who works in the Malayalam film industry. She started her career as a theater artist. Later she became a supporting actress in the Malayalam movies in late 1960s and 1970s. She has acted in more than 50 movies. She was the first woman to act in Malayalam movies and dramas from the Muslim community.

Early life
Ayisha was born in 1935 at Nilambur in the erstwhile Madras Presidency. Born into a rich family, she was interested in arts. At the age of 13, she was made to marry a 47-year-old man. But her marriage was called off in the fifth day. She was a single mother since then.

Acting career
Ayisha began acting in dramas 1950s. She made her debut in 1953 at the age of 16 with playwright E. K. Ayamu’s Ijju Nalloru Mansanakan Nokku (1953). The show was performed at over 2,500 stages in various parts of the country. Later she went on to work in theatre with popular artists such as K. T. Muhammed, Vaikom Muhammad Basheer, Khan Kavil and P. J. Antony. She played the lead in plays such as Ithu Bhoomiyanu, Theekkanal, Srishti and Kafir written and directed by K. T. Muhammed.
 
She has made her big screen entry with 1961 Hindi film Elephant Queen, directed by Rajendra. Other cast included Helen and Azad. She played the role of a woman in a hunting family. She got an entry to the film as it was shot at her hometown. Later in the year she also did her debut film in Malayalam, Kandam Becha Kottu. It was followed by films like Subaida, Kuttikkuppayam, Olavum Theeravum and Kuppivala.

Awards and honours
In 2002, Ayisha received the Kerala Sangeetha Nataka Akademi Award for Drama. She has received are the S.L. Puram State Prize for her overall contribution to theatre. She won the Kerala State Film Award for the Second Best Actress for her role in Oomakkuyil Padumbol in 2011. She was also awarded Premji Award in the year 2011.

Partial filmography

Perumkaliyaattam
Naattilellam Pattayi
Ennu Swantham Sreedharan
Nilambooritne Viplava Nakshathram
Wonder Women (2022) as Mini's grandmother
Rorschach (2022) as Shafi's mother
Vishnuvinte Umma (2022) as Vishnu's umma 
Sparsham (2022) as Ammamma
Olappurakkendhinoru Irumbuvaathil (2022) as
Swami Saranam (2022)
Khubboos   (2022)
Gift of Ummachi  (2021) as Khadeesumma
Niyathi (2021) 
Mazhayathoru Veedu (2020) as Muthassi
Tharapori (2020) as Valyumma
Baton Award (2020)
Halal Love Story (2020) as actress in telefilm
Udalazham (2019) as Housemaid
Mamangam (2019) as old woman in Chandroth family
OP Kakshi Amminipilla (2019) as Quarrelling lady at court
Virus (2019) as Staff of OP Counter, Hospital
Panthu (2019) as Amina's grandmother
Poochedi Poovinte Mottu (2019)
Koode (2018) as Grandmother
Khalifa (2018)
Mattanchery (2018)
Hello Dubaikkaran (2017) as Prakashan's grandmother
Ayishakkalam (2017)
Ka Bodyscapes (2016) as Kadeesumma
Pravasalokam (2016) as Najeeb's Ammayi
Pakal Mayum Mumoe (2016)
Nikkah (2015) as Aasiyumma 
Compartment (2015) as Devi
Alif (2015) as Ummakunju/Fathima's grandmother
Pedithondan (2014) as Umma
Koothara (2014) as Thufail's mother
Balyakalasakhi (2014) as Jinnumma
Ms. Lekha Tharoor Kanunnathu (2013) as Deceased patient in hospital 
Bioscope (2013)
Kuthanthra Siromani
Oomakkuyil Padumbol (2012) as Mansoor's umma
Nilavinte Muthu 
Njangalude Veedu 
Oru Manjukalam as Lakshmikuttiyamma
Khilafath
Entumma (2009) as Umma
Keralolsavam 2009 (2009) as Basheer's umma
Paleri Manikyam: Oru Pathirakolapathakathinte Katha (2009)
Passenger (2009) as Nabisa Umma
Vilapangalkkappuram (2008) as Valyumma
Shalabham (2008) as Villager
Shakespeare M.A. Malayalam (2008) as Mentally challenged man's mother
Kaiyoppu (2007) as Beeyathu
Paradesi (2007) as Sainu
Daivanamathil (2005) as Ammayi
Makalkku (2005) as Mental patient
Chandrolsavam (2005) as Indu's mother
Nizhalattam (2005)
Ammakkilkoodu (2003) as Inmate of old age home
 Vaalkkannadi (1992)
Mylanji (1982) (Ayishumma)
Thraasam (1981)
Anyarude Bhoomi (1979)
Nalumanipookkal (1979)
Thenthulli (1979)
Chuvanna Vithukal (1978)
Kaathirunna Nimisham (1978) as Ramu's mother
Pathiraavum Pakalvelichavum (1974)
Olavum Theeravum (1970) as Ayisha
Chemmeen (1966)
Thankakkudam (1965) as Payasakkaran's wife
Kavyamela (1965) as Bhavaniyamma
Thommante Makkal (1965)
Kattupookkal (1965)
Kaathirunna Nikkah (1965) as Amina
Kuppivala (1965) as Pathiri Aminumma
Subaidha (1965) as Subaidha's mother
Kutti Kuppayam (1964)
Laila Majnu (1962)
Kandam Becha Kottu (1961) as Bethatha
Elephant (1961) as Woman in hunting family (Hindi film)

Television Serials
 Rudraveena (Surya TV)

Dramas
 Karinkurangu
 Ithu Bhoomiyanu
 Ullathu Paranjal
 Ee Dhuniyavil Njan Ottakkanu
 Ijju Nalloru Mansanakan Nokku
 Kafir
 Theekkanal
 Srishti

References

External links
 
Nilambur Ayisha at MSI

Actresses in Malayalam cinema
Indian film actresses
Actresses from Kerala
Living people
Year of birth missing (living people)
People from Malappuram district
20th-century Indian actresses
21st-century Indian actresses
Actresses in Malayalam television
Recipients of the Kerala Sangeetha Nataka Akademi Award